This is a partial list of zoo and aquaria associations:

Global 
 Alliance of Marine Mammal Parks and Aquariums (AMMPA)
 International Marine Animal Trainers Association (IMATA)
 Species 360 (formerly International Species Information System) (ZIMS database)
 International Zoo Educators Association (IZE)
 World Association of Zoos and Aquariums (WAZA)
 ZooLex Zoo Design Organization (ZooLex)

Regional 
 Pan African Association of Zoos and Aquaria (PAAZAB)
 Asociación Latinoamericana de Parques Zoológicos y Acuarios (ALPZA)
 Asociación Mesoamericana y del Caribe de Zoológico i Acuarios (AMACZOOA)   
 (American) Association of Zoos and Aquariums (AZA)
 Eurasian Regional Association of Zoos and Aquariums (EARAZA)
 European Association of Zoos and Aquaria (EAZA)
 South Asian Zoo Association for Regional Cooperation (SAZARC)  
 South East Asian Zoos Association (SEAZA)
 Zoo and Aquarium Association (ZAA) (formerly ARAZPA)

National 
 American Association of Zoo Keepers (AAZK)
 Asociación Colombiana de Parques Zoológicos y Acuarios (ACOPAZOA)  
 Association Nationale des Parcs Zoologiques de France (ANPZ) 
 Austrian Zoo Association (OZO) 
 Board of Directors of Polish Zoological Gardens and Aquaria (RDPOZiA)
 British and Irish Association of Zoos and Aquariums (BIAZA)
 Canada's Accredited Zoos and Aquariums (CAZA)
 Central Zoo Authority of India (CZA), Governing Authority of all Zoos in India
 Chinese Association of Zoological Gardens & Aquaria (CAZG)
 Danish Association of Zoological Gardens and Aquaria (DAZA) 
 Dutch Dier en Park (D&P) 1997.
 Dutch Zoo Federation (NVD)
 German Federation of Zoo Directors (VDZ)
 Iberian Association of Zoos and Aquaria (AIZA) 
Indonesian Zoological Parks Association (Persatuan Kebun Binatang Se-Indonesia) (PKBSI)
 Israeli Zoo Association (IZA)
 Italian Union of Zoos & Aquaria (UIZA)
 Japanese Association of Zoos and Aquariums (JAZA)
 Malaysian Association of Zoological Parks and Aquaria (MAZPA)
 Mexican Zoo and Aquaria Association (AZCARM)
 National Foundation of Zoological Parks and Aquaria (FUNPZA)
 Society of Brazilian Zoos (Sociedade de Zoológicos do Brasil) (SZB)
 The Swedish Association of Zoos and Aquaria (SAZA or SDF) 
 Swiss Association of Scientific Zoos (ZOOSchweiz) 
 Syndicat National des Directeurs de Parcs Zoologiques Français (SNDPZ) 
 Union of Czech and Slovak Zoological Gardens (UCSZ) 
 Zoo Outreach Organisation (ZOO), India is an NGO
 Zoological Association of America (ZAA)
 Zoological Survey of India (ZSI)

See also
 Zoological society (disambiguation)

Notes

Zoo a